Pat Brittenden (born 1973) is a New Zealand broadcaster, blogger and political commentator.

Background
Educated in Auckland at Sacred Heart College and St Peter's College, Brittenden worked in current affairs and talkback for Newstalk ZB from 2004 until his resignation at the end of 2011. His stated reason for resigning was "to pursue some personal business opportunities". 

Brittenden has also worked for More FM Auckland, Coastline FM (now More FM Tauranga), Life FM, Newstalk ZB and New Zealand's Rhema. He was for a time the weekend breakfast announcer at Classic Hits.

Brittenden has been recognised both in New Zealand, and internationally for his broadcasting work including multiple wins at the 2014 New York Festival for World's Best Radio Programmes and in London with the Association for International Broadcasting (AIB) for his work on Newstalk BC, an hour of radio theatre re-imagining the classic Christmas story for a 21st-century audience as a talk radio station set in Jerusalem on the morning of the 'first Christmas'. Brittenden hosted the show and also co-wrote and co-directed it with Christian Broadcasting Association.

Podcasting
In the lead up to New Zealand's 2011 general election Brittenden created a PodCast with comedian Jeremy Elwood called the Slightly Correct Political Show. The show was broadcast on Facebook and featured a number of political figures. During this time Brittenden was employed by TVNZ's Breakfast programme providing election commentary. 

Brittenden currently hosts a variety of his own podcasts on his YouTube channel DOC Studios based in Dunedin. One of these podcasts includes Big Hairy News (BHN), a political podcast which mostly covers national and international current events.

Acting
Brittenden had small guest parts in Shortland Street, TV3 children's drama Secret Agent Man, and as a VJ on Juice TV. He had a recurring role as security guard Merv in the 2008 political satire The Pretender.

References

External links
Pat Brittenden website

New Zealand broadcasters
1973 births
Date of birth missing (living people)
Place of birth missing (living people)
People educated at St Peter's College, Auckland
People educated at Sacred Heart College, Auckland
Living people